Solo climbing, or soloing, is a style of climbing in which the climber climbs alone, without the assistance of a belayer (or "second"). By its very nature, it presents a higher degree of risk to the climber, and in some cases, is considered extremely high risk (e.g. freebasing or big wall free soloing).  Note that the use of the term "solo climbing" is generally separate from the action of bouldering, which is itself a form of solo climbing, but with less serious consequences in the case of a fall.

Minimal protection

The following types of "solo climbing" have minimal or no form of climbing protection, and the climber exposes themselves to potentially fatal risks:

 Free solo climbing (sometimes referred to as soloing in the UK, or third-classing in the US) is where the climber uses no climbing protection (or any form of climbing aid, except for their climbing shoes and their climbing chalk), and ascends a single-pitch, or a multi-pitch/big wall climbing route. 
 Free soloing is the most dramatic solo technique, and in 2017 became an Oscar-winning documentary film, Free Solo that featured Alex Honnold free soloing the  35-pitch rock climbing route Freerider in Yosemite, the world's first-ever free solo of a  big wall route in history.
 Deep-water soloing (DWS), is a subtype of free solo climbing performed on rock faces overhanging water where in the case of a fall, the climber lands in the water. Noted DWS climbers include Chris Sharma who created the world's  world's first-ever  DWS route, at Es Pontas in 2007.
 FreeBASEing, is a subtype of free solo climbing performed on long multi-pitch big wall routes with a BASE jumping parachute as the sole means of protection, where a falling climber opens their parachute to arrest their fall.  FreeBASEing was pioneered by Dean Potter who made a freeBASE ascent of Deep Blue Sea (5.12+) on the north face of the Eiger in 2008.
 Highball bouldering, is where the boulder exceeds  in height, and therefore any fall, even where bouldering mats are used, presents a risk of serious injury.  Where highball bouldering ends and free soloing begins is a source of debate amongst climbers.  Notable highball boulders include Nalle Hukkataival's Livin' Large  in Rocklands, South Africa., and Ron Fawcett's Careless Torque  in Stanage Edge, England.
 Buildering, is a subtype of free solo climbing where the climber ascends a public building (or mechanical structure with crane climbing), which is usually performed without any protection.  Notable building climbers include Alain Robert (who also made world's first-ever free solo of an  rock climbing route), who has free soloed several major buildings including the Eiffel Tower and the Burj Khalifa.

Full protection

The following types of "solo climbing" have a form of climbing protection, involving mechanical self-arrest or progress capture, that significantly reduce the risk of serious or fatal injury to the climber:

 Rope solo climbing, is climbing alone but with a rope to help arrest a fall, or for a self-rescue if required.  Instead of having a belayer, the climber uses a self-locking device that will hold the rope in the case of a fall, and leads the route in a traditional climbing manner, placing climbing protection as they ascend.  One end of the rope is anchored below the climber and the climber pays-out the rope through the self-locking device as they ascend. Once they reach the top, they need to abseil down and re-ascend the route with an ascender, to remove the protection they placed earlier. 
In 1992, French climber Catherine Destivelle used such a self-locking device to rope-solo the first part of the traditional climbing route El Matador , on the Devils Tower in Wyoming (she free soloed the second part), and was captured in the climbing film, Ballade à Devil's Tower.  In 1992, Destivelle used the rope solo technique to create Voie Destivelle (VI 5.11b A5) on the west face of the Petit Dru, and was captured in the climbing film, 11 Days on the Dru.  In 2016, Pete Whittaker rope-soloed the  35-pitch route Freerider in Yosemite in a single day.
Top rope solo climbing, is a form of top roping where a single static fixed rope, anchored to the top of the route, is laid along the length of the climb.  The climber then clips-into the fixed rope using at least one progress capture device (PCD) such as a Petzl Micro Traxion or a Camp Lift, that will allow the rope to pay-through as the climber ascends but will grip the rope tightly in the event of a fall.

Gallery

See also
Aid climbing, where the climber uses mechanical aids to help ascend a route (i.e. not just for protection)
Traditional climbing, which requires the climber to place their climbing protection during the climb
Sport climbing, that uses pre-placed bolted climbing protection

References

Types of climbing
Solo activities